Monopis is a genus of the fungus moth family, Tineidae. Therein, it belongs to the nominate subfamily, Tineinae.

A typical feature of these moths is a semi-transparent pale spot near the middle of the forewings. There usually are contrasting white markings adjacent to it. Otherwise, the forewings are generally unpatterned and brown to blackish-grey in color.

Hyalospila is a synonym.  The snout moth genus Zonula (moth) was invalidly described by Ragonot in 1888; the geometer moth genus Locha was invalidly described by Warren in 1894.

Selected species
Species currently placed in Monopis include:

 Monopis argillacea (Meyrick, 1893) 
 Monopis burmanni Petersen, 1979
 Monopis chrysogramma (Lower, 1899)
 Monopis cirrhospila Turner, 1923
 Monopis congestella (Walker, 1864)
 Monopis crocicapitella (Clemens, 1859) (= M. heringi, M. hyalinella, M. lombardica)
 Monopis dimorphella Dugdale, 1971
 Monopis dorsistrigella (Clemens, 1859) (= M. subjunctella)
 Monopis ethelella (Newman, 1856)
 Monopis fenestratella (Heyden, 1863)
 Monopis henderickxi Gaedike & Karsholt 2001
 Monopis icterogastra – wool moth
 Monopis imella
 Monopis jacobsi  Gozmány, 1967
 Monopis laevigella – skin moth
 Monopis longella
 Monopis marginistrigella (Chambers, 1873) (= M. irrorella)
 Monopis megalodelta  Meyrick, 1908
 Monopis meliorella (Walker, 1863)
 Monopis monacha Zagulajev, 1972
 Monopis monachella
 Monopis mycetophilella Powell, 1967
 Monopis nigricantella (Millière, 1872)
 Monopis obviella
 Monopis ochroptila Turner, 1923
 Monopis ornithias (Meyrick, 1888)
 Monopis pallidella Zagulajev, 1955
 Monopis pavlovskii Zagulajev, 1955
 Monopis pentadisca Meyrick, 1924
 Monopis spilotella (Tengström, 1848) (= M. biflavimaculella, M. halospila, M. insignisella)
 Monopis stichomela (Lower, 1900)
 Monopis straminella Zagulajev, 1958
 Monopis trigonoleuca Turner, 1917
 Monopis weaverella (Scott, 1858)

M. christophi is either a junior synonym of M. pallidella or the senior synonym of M. straminella. Also placed here by some authors is Reisserita barbarosi.

Synonyms
Junior synonyms of Monopis are:
 Blabophanes Zeller, 1852
 Eusynopa Lower, 1903
 Hyalospila Herrich-Schäffer, 1853
 Rhitia Walker, 1864

Footnotes

References

  (2008): Australian Faunal Directory – Monopis. Version of 2008-OCT-09. Retrieved 2010-MAY-09.
  (2009): Monopis. Version 2.1, 2009-DEC-22. Retrieved 2010-MAY-09.
  (2004): Butterflies and Moths of the World, Generic Names and their Type-species – Monopis. Version of 2004-NOV-05. Retrieved 2010-MAY-09.
  [2010]: Global Taxonomic Database of Tineidae (Lepidoptera). Retrieved 2010-MAY-09.
  (2003): Markku Savela's Lepidoptera and some other life forms – Monopis. Version of 2003-DEC-28. Retrieved 2010-MAY-09.

Tineinae
Moth genera